The 2017–18 season is Al Ahly's 59th season in the Egyptian Premier League. The club will participate in the Egyptian Premier League, Egypt Cup, Egyptian Super Cup, finish the 2017 CAF Champions League campaign and start the 2018 campaign.

Squad

Current squad

Transfers

Transfers in

Transfers out

Loans out

Suspensions

Statistics

Squad appearances and goals
Last updated on 24 May 2018

|-
! colspan=14 style=background:#dcdcdc; text-align:center|Goalkeepers

|-
! colspan=14 style=background:#dcdcdc; text-align:center|Defenders

|-
! colspan=14 style=background:#dcdcdc; text-align:center|Midfielders

|-
! colspan=14 style=background:#dcdcdc; text-align:center|Forwards

|-
|}

Squad statistics

Friendlies

2017 Egyptian Super Cup

{| style="width:100%"
|-
|style="vertical-align:top;width:40%"|

2017–18 Egyptian Premier League

Position

Results

Results by round

Match details

2018 Egypt Cup

First round

Round of 16

Quarter final

2017 CAF Champions League

Quarter-finals

Semi-finals

Final

Wydad Casablanca won 2–1 on aggregate.

2018 CAF Champions League

First round

Al-Ahly won 7–1 on aggregate.

Group stage

Group A

Note:Rest of the group stage matches were held in next season

References

Al Ahly SC seasons
Egyptian football clubs 2017–18 season